Zamia tuerckheimii is a species of plant in the family Zamiaceae. 

It was named after Hans von Türckheim, a German plant collector. 
It is endemic to Alta Verapaz, Guatemala. Its natural habitat is subtropical or tropical moist lowland forests. It is threatened by habitat loss.

References

Endemic flora of Guatemala
tuerckheimii
Near threatened plants
Taxonomy articles created by Polbot